The Grail, also Ladies of the Grail, is a Catholic community of about a thousand women from 24 countries, many different cultures and very different backgrounds and work situations.

History
The Grail was started in 1921 as the Women of Nazareth by Fr. Jacques van Ginneken, a Dutch Jesuit. He felt that many new possibilities were opening up for women and that a group of lay women, unconfined by convent walls and rules, could make an immense contribution to the transformation of the world. By 1939 the Grail had become a colourful movement involving thousands of young women in the Netherlands, United Kingdom and Germany, challenging them to deep personal and spiritual commitment. Pioneers in Catholic feminist theology, the Grail in the USA voted in 1969 to admit women of other Christian denominations, and in 1975, to accept Jewish women as members.

The Grail was started in Australia in 1936, in the United States in 1940, in New Zealand in the late 1930s, in Brazil and South Africa in 1951, in Uganda in 1953, in Portugal in 1958 and subsequently in Tanzania, Ghana, Nigeria, Italy, Mexico, Canada, the Philippines, Papua New Guinea, Mozambique, Kenya and Sweden. Grail members are also working in Belgium, Belize, Cape Verde, Egypt, France, India, Indonesia, Ireland, Malaysia, Switzerland, Ecuador and Zimbabwe. Its United States headquarters, known as Grailville, is located in Loveland, Ohio.

Ecclesiastical status
In England, the Grail has the status of a secular institute within the Catholic Church, an association of lay people making a permanent commitment to a particular form of Christian life.

References

Further reading 
 
 
 Reid, Elizabeth Julia ( 1961). I Belong where I am Needed. Link to Internet archive
 DeFerrari, Patricia (1998). "Collaborating in Christ's Redeeming Work: The U.S. Grail and Social Reform in the 1950s." US Catholic Historian. 16 (4):109-126. 
 Kalven, Janet. Women Breaking Boundaries: a Grail Journey.

External links 
 Official international website of The Grail
 "Grailville The Early Decades" YouTube video by YouTube user TheGrailintheUSA

Catholic lay organisations
Catholic female orders and societies
Christian organizations established in 1921
Secular institutes